The 1908 Chattanooga Moccasins football team represented the University of Chattanooga—now known as the University of Tennessee at Chattanooga—as an independent in the 1908 college football season.

Schedule

References

Chattanooga
Chattanooga Mocs football seasons
Chattanooga Moccasins football